Radio Bakhita 91.0 FM – the Voice of the Church –  is a media house owned by the Roman Catholic Archdiocese of Juba, South Sudan. It was established in 2006 and officially opened in Juba on 8 February 2007, the day the Church there celebrates the country's first saint, Josephine Bakhita.  It was established with the aim of "creating a platform to promote evangelization, communication for peace and good governance, as well as the general public’s active participation in the life of the country."

It is the main station of the South Sudan Catholic Radio Network, covering an area of around 300 km2, with a claimed potential audience of 1,000,000. The station transmits daily from 6:00 AM through 9:00 PM in two languages, catering to both speakers of Juba Arabic and English.

Programming
Radio Bakhita 91.0 broadcasts call-in discussion shows, community news, and short segments on health, education, peacebuilding, youth religious life, and women's rights. Particular broadcasts are designed for people traumatized by civil war.  Radio Bakhita 91.0 also broadcasts programmes for specific skills, such as Terbia A and Terbia B, which consist of four series of 60 half-hour English language lessons that range from beginning to advanced levels.

State censorship
Like other radio and print news sources in South Sudan, Radio Bakhita 91.0 has been periodically shut down by the country's security services for allowing live phone calls and open debates, and for broadcasting clips of opponents of the government of South Sudan.  In August 2014, Security Services shut down the station and arrested several journalists.

References 

Radio stations in South Sudan
News media in South Sudan